Stanley Fink, Baron Fink  (born 15 September 1957) is a British hedge fund manager and politician, who was formerly CEO of Man Group plc. A member of the Conservative Party, he has been a life peer in the House of Lords since 2011.

Early life
Stanley Fink was born on 15 September 1957 in Crumpsall, Lancashire; his father ran a grocery store. Fink was educated at Manchester Grammar School before going on to study at Trinity Hall, Cambridge.

Business career
Fink started his career at the accountancy firm, Arthur Andersen, qualifying as FCA before briefly working for Mars Inc, then joining Citibank. He served as chief executive officer of Man Group, a hedge fund, from 2000 to 2007. Described as the "godfather" of the UK hedge fund industry, he is credited with building the Man Group up to its FTSE 100 public company status, the largest listed hedge fund company in the world.

In September 2008, Fink came out of retirement to act as the chief executive of International Standard Asset Management (ISAM) in partnership with Lord Levy. Appointed chairman of ISAM in 2015, he retired from its board in December 2018.

In 2013, Fink featured on web reality TV show HF Lions' Den, when Lord Fink interviewed three emerging hedge fund managers, and allocated $25 million in investment between the three funds.

Fink serves on the board of Marex Spectron and was a chairman and largest shareholder of Zenith Hygiene Group for 10 years, which was sold to Bain Capital in 2018.

Fink is a seed investor in Ecometrica, a leading environmental software business which, headquartered in Edinburgh, operates globally. An early investor in New Forests Company, among the largest sustainable forestry businesses in Africa operating in Uganda, Tanzania and Rwanda, the company has become a market leader in the provision of sustainable wood and FSC-certified transmission poles throughout East Africa.

In July 2018, Fink was appointed as Global Special Advisor to eToro. Later that year, the Fink family office was formed, which invests predominantly in PropTech, FinTech and EdTech ventures, and includes:

 British Pearl – property investment platform: also chairman;
 Farillio – speedy, easy law;
 Bud – leaders in open banking;
 Seneca Learning – a leading education platform;
 PiTops – a leading STEM, creative learning company;
 Blackbullion – helping teach students financial literacy;
 Project Etopia – leading modular building company, also chairman;
 part owner of hotel group, K2, with 2 leading luxury hotels in Courchevel.

Political career
In January 2009, Fink was appointed Co-Treasurer of the Conservative Party. Created a life peer on 18 January 2011, he took the title of Baron Fink, of Northwood in the County of Middlesex; Lord and Lady Fink were regular guests of David Cameron at Chequers and, after the resignation of Peter Cruddas over a cash-for-access controversy, Lord Fink returned as Treasurer of the Conservative Party, which he had previously given £2.62m: he is among the top 20 biggest donors to the Conservative Party.

In February 2015, Fink was accused by the Labour leader Ed Miliband of undertaking "tax evasion activities". In reply, he stated simply that not only he avoided tax, but that "everyone does tax avoidance at some level".

Philanthropy
Lord Fink is Chairman of Governors at Ark Burlington Danes Academy, President of Evelina Children's Hospital and serves on the Board of Trustees of the Oxford Centre for Hebrew and Jewish Studies. In September 2009, he was appointed chairman of Absolute Return for Kids. In 2010, he and Cherie Blair attended a fundraiser for learning difficulties charity Norwood, of which he is a benefactor.

Personal life
In 1981, Fink married Barbara Paskin; they have two sons, Jordan and Alex, and a daughter, Gabriella, and live in north London, as well as owning property in France and Spain.

Arms

References

1957 births
Living people
People from Crumpsall
People educated at Manchester Grammar School
Alumni of Trinity Hall, Cambridge
British hedge fund managers
English financial businesspeople
British chief executives
Conservative Party (UK) life peers
British Eurosceptics
English philanthropists
Fellows of King's College London
Life peers created by Elizabeth II